Daoud Kuttab, (born 1 April 1955) is a Palestinian-American journalist.

Journalism 
In 1980, Kuttab began his career at Al-Fajr, an English-language weekly newspaper. Over the next seven years, he was promoted to features editor and then managing editor. In 1987, he left Al-Fajr for Al-Quds, an Arabic-language daily newspaper based in East Jerusalem. He also contributed to The Jerusalem Post. During this period, he became the first Palestinian to receive an exclusive interview with Yitzhak Rabin, as well as from Shimon Peres and several other Israeli leaders.

Kuttab was critical of press censorship by both the Israel government and the Palestinian Authority. On several occasions, he participated in rallies against Israeli censorship, resulting in his being arrested and searched. In 1994, Kuttab led journalists to rally in protest of the banning of the daily newspaper Al-Nahar by the Palestinian National Authority. Al-Quds subsequently fired Kuttab at the direct order of President Yasir Arafat. Kuttab continued to work as a journalist, however, writing for papers including The Daily Telegraph, Daily Yomuri, International Herald Tribune, Los Angeles Times, The New York Times, and The Washington Post. In April 1996, he also created the Arabic Media Internet Network, an online magazine for uncensored Palestinian journalism.

In May 1997, Kuttab was detained without charge by Arafat's government, reportedly for producing live broadcasts of Palestinian Legislative Council meetings. He was released one week later following local and international pressure.

Awards
He has won several international awards, including a 1996 International Press Freedom Award of the US-based Committee to Protect Journalists. The award was given on behalf of his struggles for press freedom in both Israel and the Palestinian Authority.

In 2000, the Austria-based International Press Institute named him one of its fifty World Press Freedom Heroes of the previous fifty years.

Kuttab sits on the board of the International Press Institute, which lists him as the "Director General, Community Media Network" and "Founder, AmmanNet, Jordan."

References

External links

 
 AmmanNet, Internet radio station
 The Arab Radio Internet Network

1955 births
American journalists of Arab descent
American writers of Palestinian descent
Palestinian journalists
Living people
Palestinian columnists
Palestinian emigrants to the United States
People from Bethlehem